Rjukan Station is the terminal railway station of the Rjukan Line, located at Rjukan in Tinn, Norway.

The station opened as part of the railway on 9 August 1909 as Saaheim, until renaming to Rjukan on 15 November 1912. It was rebuilt 1959-60 and closed on 5 July 1991; after the closing the local radio station Radio Rjukan has moved into the building.

References

Railway stations on the Rjukan Line
Railway stations in Tinn
Railway stations opened in 1909
Railway stations closed in 1991
Disused railway stations in Norway
1909 establishments in Norway
1991 disestablishments in Norway